This is a list of the Luxembourg national football team results from 1910 to 1959.

1910s

1920s

1930s

1940s

1950s

References 

 
National team
Luxembourg national football team results